Robert Boyce Brandom (born March 13, 1950) is an American philosopher who teaches at the University of Pittsburgh. He works primarily in philosophy of language, philosophy of mind and philosophical logic, and his academic output manifests both systematic and historical interests in these topics. His work has presented "arguably the first fully systematic and technically rigorous attempt to explain the meaning of linguistic items in terms of their socially norm-governed use ("meaning as use", to cite the Wittgensteinian slogan), thereby also giving a non-representationalist account of the intentionality of thought and the rationality of action as well."

Brandom is broadly considered to be part of the American pragmatist tradition in philosophy. In 2003 he won the Mellon Distinguished Achievement Award.

Education
Brandom earned his BA in 1972 from Yale University and his PhD in 1977 from Princeton University, under Richard Rorty and David Kellogg Lewis. His doctoral thesis was titled Practice and Object.

Philosophy
Brandom's work is heavily influenced by that of Wilfrid Sellars, Richard Rorty, Michael Dummett and his Pittsburgh colleague John McDowell.  He also draws heavily on the works of Immanuel Kant, G. W. F. Hegel, Gottlob Frege, and Ludwig Wittgenstein.

He is best known for his investigations of linguistic meanings, or semantics. He advocates the view that the meaning of an expression is fixed by how it is used in inferences (see inferential role semantics). This project is developed at length in his influential 1994 book Making It Explicit, and more briefly in Articulating Reasons: An Introduction to Inferentialism (2000); a chapter of that latter work, "Semantic Inferentialism and Logical Expressivism", outlines the main themes of representationalism (the tradition of basing semantics on the concept of representation) vs. inferentialism (the conviction for an expression to be meaningful is to be governed by a certain kind of inferential rules) and inferentialism's relationship to logical expressivism (the conviction that "logic is expressive in the sense that it makes explicit or codifies certain aspects of the inferential structure of our discursive practice").

Brandom has also published a collection of essays on the history of philosophy, Tales of the Mighty Dead (2002), a critical and historical sketch of what he calls the "philosophy of intentionality". He is the editor of a collection of papers about Richard Rorty's philosophy, Rorty and His Critics (2000). Brandom delivered the 2006 John Locke lectures at Oxford University, which Oxford University Press published under the title Between Saying and Doing: Towards an Analytic Pragmatism (2008). In 2019 he published A Spirit of Trust, a book about Hegel's Phenomenology of Spirit.

Books
The Logic of Inconsistency, with Nicholas Rescher. Basil Blackwell, Oxford 1980.
Making It Explicit: Reasoning, Representing, and Discursive Commitment, Harvard University Press (Cambridge) 1994. 
Empiricism and the Philosophy of Mind, by Wilfrid Sellars, Robert B. Brandom (ed.) Harvard University Press, 1997. With an introduction by Richard Rorty and Study Guide by Robert Brandom  
Rorty and His Critics, edited, with an introduction (includes "Vocabularies of Pragmatism") by Robert Brandom. Original essays by: Rorty, Habermas, Davidson, Putnam, Dennett, McDowell, Bouveresse, Brandom, Williams, Allen, Bilgrami, Conant, and Ramberg. Blackwell Publishers, Oxford, July 2000  
Articulating Reasons: An Introduction to Inferentialism, Harvard University Press, 2000 (paperback 2001), 230 pp.  
Tales of the Mighty Dead: Historical Essays in the Metaphysics of Intentionality, Harvard University Press, 2002. 
In the Space of Reasons: Selected Essays of Wilfrid Sellars, edited with an introduction by Kevin Scharp and Robert Brandom. Harvard University Press, 2007. 
Between Saying and Doing: Towards an Analytic Pragmatism, Oxford University Press, 2008. 
Reason in Philosophy: Animating Ideas, Harvard University Belknap Press, 2009. 
Perspectives on Pragmatism: Classical, Recent, & Contemporary, Harvard University Press, 2011. 
From Empiricism to Expressivism: Brandom Reads Sellars, Harvard University Press, 2015 
Wiedererinnerter Idealismus, Suhrkamp Verlag, 2015  (in German)
A Spirit of Trust: A Reading of Hegel's Phenomenology, Harvard University Press, 2019.

References

Further reading
 Bernd Prien and David P. Schweikard (eds.), Robert Brandom: Analytic Pragmatist, Ontos, 2008, 194pp., . [Collection of essays with Brandom’s responses].
 Jeremy Wanderer, Robert Brandom, Acumen Publishing (UK); McGill-Queens University Press (US), 2008, 256 pp. 256 . [Critical introduction].
 Bernhard Weiss and Jeremy Wanderer (eds.), Reading Brandom: On Making It Explicit, Routledge 2010, 371 pp,  [Collection of essays—including contributions by Gibbard, Dennett, Taylor, McDowell, Dummett, Fodor and Lepore and Wright—with Brandom's responses].
 Ronald Loeffler, Brandom, Polity Press, 2017, 240 pp. . [Critical introduction].

External links
Home page
2005-2006 John Locke Lectures
Interview 1999
Presentation in Sydney 2005
2010 interview with Brandom about pragmatism: Part 1, Part 2.
Interview at 3AM Magazine
2014 draft of A Spirit of Trust

20th-century American philosophers
Analytic philosophers
Philosophers of mind
Philosophers of language
Living people
Yale University alumni
Princeton University alumni
University of Pittsburgh faculty
American logicians
21st-century American philosophers
1950 births